Corin, also called atrial natriuretic peptide-converting enzyme, is a protein that in humans is encoded by the CORIN gene.

Protein 

Human corin, a polypeptide of 1042 amino acids, consists of an N-terminal cytoplasmic domain, a transmembrane domain and an extracellular region with two frizzled-like domains, eight LDL receptor-like domains, a scavenger receptor-like domain and a C-terminal trypsin-like serine protease domain. Corin is synthesized as a zymogen that is activated by PCSK6.

Corin exhibits a trypsin-like catalytic activity favoring basic residues at the P1 position.

Human corin contains 19 N-glycosylation sites.  N-glycans promote corin expression on the cell surface and protect corin from metalloproteinase-mediated shedding.

Function 

Corin converts the atrial natriuretic peptide (ANP) precursor, pro-ANP, to mature ANP, a cardiac hormone that regulates salt-water balance and blood pressure.  In mice, corin deficiency prevents pro-ANP processing and causes salt-sensitive hypertension.

Corin may also function as a pro-brain-type natriuretic peptide convertase.

Corin-mediated ANP production in the pregnant uterus promotes spiral artery remodeling and trophoblast invasion.  CORIN mutations have been reported in patients with preeclampsia.

In mice, corin functions in the dermal papilla to regulate coat color in an Agouti-dependent pathway.

Variants and mutations 

Variants encoded by alternative exons were reported in human and mouse corin. A variant allele (T555I/Q568P) was found in African Americans with hypertension and cardiac hypertrophy.  The amino acid substitutions impaired corin activity. An insertion variant in exon 1 alters the cytoplasmic tail.  This variant appeared more frequently in hypertensive patients. CORIN mutations were found in patients with hypertension.

References

External links

Further reading